She's a Boy I Knew is a Canadian documentary film by Gwen Haworth, released in 2007. The film documents Haworth's process of coming out as transgender and undergoing gender transition, using a combination of interviews, home video footage, short animation clips and interviews with her friends and family about its impact on them.

The film premiered at the Vancouver International Film Festival in 2007. It won the People's Choice Award for Most Popular Canadian Film, and Haworth won the Women in Film and Television Vancouver Artistic Merit Award. At the 2008 Inside Out Film and Video Festival, it won the Audience Award for Best Documentary.

See also 
 List of LGBT films directed by women

References

External links

2007 films
Canadian documentary films
Canadian LGBT-related films
2007 LGBT-related films
Transgender-related documentary films
Films about trans women
2000s English-language films
2000s Canadian films